Kim Woo-seok (born October 27, 1996), also known by the stage name Wooshin, is a South Korean singer, songwriter and actor. He debuted as a member of South Korean band Up10tion in 2015. In 2019, he rose to prominence after finishing second on Produce X 101, which made him a member of X1. He debuted as a solo artist with the release of his first extended play, 1st Desire (Greed), on May 25, 2020.

Early life
Kim Woo-seok was born on October 27, 1996, in Daedeok District, Daejeon, South Korea. He is the only child in his family.

On February 28, 2016, Kim was enrolled at Dong-ah Institute of Media and Arts, majoring in acting and K-pop.

Career

2015–2018: Up10tion

Kim first appeared in Up10tion's pre-debut program, "Masked Rookie King Up10tion" in 2015. He was the first member to be introduced to the group. He made his official debut in South Korea on September 11, 2015, with their first EP, Top Secret.

On October 6, 2016, he was selected as the host of SBS MTV's The Show alongside Jeon Somi. They had their first broadcast on October 11. Six months later, on April 25, 2017, the duo officially left their position.

Kim went on hiatus on June 6 of the same year due to mental health issues, returning nine months later for the release of the group's first studio album, Invitation.

2019: Produce X 101 and X1

In March 2019, Kim Woo-seok was revealed to be a contestant of Produce X 101, along with his fellow Up10tion member, Lee Jin-hyuk. Kim placed second in the final episode with 3,120,276 votes, earning a spot in the final lineup. He debuted with X1 on August 27, 2019 with the release of their first EP, Emergency: Quantum Leap. Following revelations of the Mnet vote manipulation investigation, X1 announced that they were to disband on January 6, 2020.

2020–present: 1st Desire (Greed), 2nd Desire (Tasty), 3rd Desire (Reve), departure from Up10tion and Blank Space
On March 4, 2020, Playlist Studio's CEO, Park Tae-won, announced that Kim would be the male lead of the web drama Twenty-Twenty. The whole cast would begin the filming later on April. On August 15, 2020, the first episode was premiered on Naver TV Cast. The series then also became available on YouTube and JTBC on August 22 and September 6, respectively.

On April 23, 2020, Kim announced that he would release his solo debut EP, on May 25. On May 25, 2020, he debuted as a solo artist with his debut extended play 1st Desire (Greed) along with the lead single "Red Moon".

On August 13, 2020, he was awarded New K-Wave Voice Award at the 4th Soribada Best K-Music Awards in 2020.

On January 18, 2021, it was announced that Kim would make his comeback with a new album in February. On February 8, 2021, Kim released his second EP 2nd Desire (Tasty) along with the lead single "Sugar". On February 18, 2021, Kim received his first music show win on M Countdown, becoming the first Up10tion member to get a music show win. Thereafter, he went on to receive another music show win on Music Bank in February 2021.

On March 17, 2021, tvN has released the full main casts for new drama, Bulgasal, which Kim has been selected to be part of. He will played as Nam Do-yoon, a high school student who always follows Dan Hwal like a puppy and always make a clown smile. It is scheduled to premiere on December 18, 2021, on tvN.

On March 7, 2022, Kim released his third EP 3rd Desire (Reve) along with the lead single "Switch".

On July 23, 2022, Kim held a fan meeting 'KIM WOO SEOK 1ST FANMEETING: NNN'.

In February 2023, the agency confirmed that Kim would release his fourth album Blank Page in March, then in April. On February 28, it was announced that Kim would be leaving Up10tion.

Discography

Extended plays

Singles

As lead artist

Collaborations

Filmography

Television series

Web series

Television shows

Awards and nominations

Notes

References

External links
 
 
 

Living people
1996 births
21st-century South Korean male actors
21st-century South Korean male  singers
South Korean male idols
Swing Entertainment artists
Produce 101 contestants
Reality show winners
South Korean male web series actors